After the 27 August 2016 presidential election in Gabon, in which President Ali Bongo Ondimba was narrowly re-elected against opposition candidate Jean Ping, armed clashes between supporters of Ping, who claimed victory, and police erupted, resulting in the authorities blocking the internet in Libreville.

Events
Violence broke out in at least nine of Libreville's neighborhoods when official results were announced on 31 August 2016, showing a narrow victory for President Bongo, and protesters set the national parliament building ablaze. Rioting and violence continued on 1 September. Ping's headquarters were surrounded and bombed by a presidential guard helicopter, killing two people. Gunfire and explosions were heard in the neighborhood of Nkembo. According to a local resident, government forces attacked an opposition radio and television station. Some looting was reported. Around 1,100 people were said to have been arrested as security forces fought to suppress the riots. Pacome Moubelet Boubeya, the Minister of the Interior, condemned the violence and accused Ping and other opposition leaders of orchestrating it; he also claimed that the rioters were armed with AK-47s and grenades, although the opposition denied that. President Bongo labelled the opposition leaders as "a small group whose only aim is to take power for themselves."

On 31 August, the major telecom companies in Gabon cut off Internet access.

Also on 1 September, Jean Ping again claimed to have won the election and declared that "the only solution is that Bongo recognizes defeat". He said that he would not bother appealing to the Constitutional Court because it was "a tool of the governing authority" that merely followed orders; instead, he appealed to the international community to intervene in the face of the government crackdown. Dismissing calls to publish the results for each individual polling station, the government said that could only be done if the opposition followed the legal process and appealed to the Constitutional Court.

By 2 September life in Libreville appeared to be beginning to return to normal, although there was a heavy presence of security forces maintaining order. Meanwhile, Ping held a press conference and declared himself to be President. He called for a general strike to begin on 5 September: "I ask you from today onward not to use violence but to resist by blocking the country's economy". Nevertheless, business in Libreville was reported to be proceeding relatively normally. Internet access was restored . Also on 5 September, Séraphin Moundounga, the Second Deputy Prime Minister for Justice, resigned to protest the government's unwillingness to conduct a recount, which he argued was leading to violence.

Despite his previous criticism of the Constitutional Court, Ping appealed the results to the Court on 8 September, hoping to force a recount in Haut-Ogooue Province. Ping warned on 9 September that if the Court did not rule in favor of a recount, "profound and sustained instability" could follow.

Following the election, the government planned to hold an "inclusive political dialogue" to help resolve the ongoing discord. While about 50 political parties and 1,200 organizations were expected to attend the dialogue, Jean Ping and his supporters, gathered together in the Coalition for the New Republic, refused to participate. The dialogue was scheduled to begin on 28 March 2017.

Reactions
 evacuated its nationals working in an oil-field in Gabon.

See also
Gabonese presidential election, 2016
Gabonese legislative election, 2016
2009 Gabonese protests

References

2016 in Gabon
2016 protests
August 2016 events in Africa
21st century in Libreville
Politics of Gabon
Protests against results of elections
September 2016 events in Africa
Events in Libreville
Protests in Gabon